Juan-les-Pins is a town in the commune of Antibes in the Alpes-Maritimes department in Southeastern France. Located on the French Riviera, it is situated between Nice and Cannes,  to the southwest of Nice Côte d'Azur Airport. Juan-les-Pins is a major holiday destination popular with the international jet set, with a casino, nightclubs and beaches. It is served by Juan-les-Pins station on the Marseille–Ventimiglia railway.

History

Situated west of the town of Antibes on the western slope of the ridge, halfway to the old fishery village of Golfe-Juan (where Napoleon landed in 1815), it had been an area with many stone pine trees ( in French), where the inhabitants of Antibes used to go for a promenade, for a picnic in the shadow of the stone pine trees or to collect tree branches and cones for their stoves.

The village was given the name Juan-les-Pins on 12 March 1882. The spelling Juan, used instead of the customary French spelling, Jean, derives from the local Occitan dialect. Other names discussed for the town include Héliopolis, Antibes-les-Pins and Albany-les-Pins (after the Duke of Albany, the fourth son of Queen Victoria).

The following year, 1883, it was decided to build a railway station in Juan-les-Pins on the Paris-Lyon-Méditerranée (PLM) line that had been there since 1863. 

In 1926, the famous hotel Le Provençal was opened and received guests like Charlie Chaplin, Lilian Harvey, Jack L. Warner and Man Ray.

Jazz à Juan

Cultural references
F. Scott Fitzgerald mentions Juan les Pins in Tender is the Night. 

Nelly persuades Pierre to move to Juan-les-Pins to escape his mother in Jacques Feyder's Pension Mimosas (1935).

Peter Sarstedt famously mentions Juan-les-Pins in his 1969 UK number one hit, "Where Do You Go To (My Lovely)"; a portrait of a girl who becomes a member of the Euro jet-set. The lyrics refer to the girl spending her summer vacations in Juan-les-Pins.

"Golfe Juan" is the name of a pointillist painting done by Paul Signac, a French neo-impressionist, in 1896.

Juan-les-Pins is prominent in Sartre's The Reprieve, the second volume of his Roads to Freedom trilogy.

The area is also the home of Lanny Budd, the protagonist in eleven Upton Sinclair novels.

In Charles R. Jackson's novel The Lost Weekend, the main character, Don Birnam, mentions a holiday in Juan-les-Pins.
In Alan Furst's novel "Kingdom of Shadows", protagonist Nicholas Morath, his Argentine girlfriend Cara, and assorted friends spend early June 1938 in Juan-les-Pins.
Near the end of Donna Tartt's ' 'The Goldfinch' ', the protagonist travels to many 'exotic places,' such as Juan-Les-Pins, to rectify his wrongdoings.

Camille Aubray's fictional novel Cooking for Picasso takes place in Juan-les-Pins.

Points of interest
 Jardin botanique de la Villa Thuret
 Aujourd'hui, curvy modernistic seaside former beach house of movie mogul Jack L. Warner
 Home of the 6 Jours d'Antibes, the Antibes 6 Day Race.
 5, Rue Jacques Leonetti, 06160, Antibes, the address of the world's first Discothèque, in 1947, (now demolished), opened by Paul Pacini, (died 12/12/'17), ((later of Cannes Radio)), the 'Whisky à GoGo'; (the name taken from the 'Galore', in Whisky Galore (novel), published the same year, by Compton Mackenzie.

Personalities
Frank Jay Gould
F. Scott Fitzgerald
Gerald Murphy
Dominique Guillo
Georges Milton

Twin towns
 New Orleans (United States)

See also
Gare de Juan-les-Pins

References

External links

 Festivals Internationaux de Bridge d'Antibes en Juan-les-Pins

Villages in Provence-Alpes-Côte d'Azur
Antibes
French Riviera
Seaside resorts in France
Spa towns in France

ru:Антиб#Жюан-ле-Пен